Jeremy Hall may refer to:

 Jeremy Hall (footballer) (born 1988), Puerto Rican football player and manager 
 Jeremy Hall (United States Army) (born 1985), United States Army specialist and atheist
 Jeremy Hall (businessman) (born 1965), British businessman and chairman of Who's Who Publications Plc
 Jeremy Hall (rower) Canadian pararower